Progress 17 was a Soviet uncrewed Progress cargo spacecraft, which was launched in August 1983 to resupply the Salyut 7 space station.

Spacecraft
Progress 17 was a Progress 7K-TG spacecraft. The 17th of forty three to be launched, it had the serial number 119. The Progress 7K-TG spacecraft was the first generation Progress, derived from the Soyuz 7K-T and intended for uncrewed logistics missions to space stations in support of the Salyut programme. On some missions the spacecraft were also used to adjust the orbit of the space station.

The spacecraft were powered by chemical batteries, and could operate in free flight for up to three days, remaining docked to the station for up to thirty.

Launch
Progress 17 launched on 17 August 1983 from the Baikonur Cosmodrome in the Kazakh SSR. It used a Soyuz-U rocket.

Docking
Progress 17 docked with the aft port of Salyut 7 on 19 August 1983 at 13:47 UTC, and was undocked on 17 September 1983 at 11:44 UTC.

Decay
It remained in orbit until 17 September 1983, when it was deorbited. The deorbit burn occurred at 23:43 UTC, with the mission ending at 00:30 UTC the following day.

See also

 1983 in spaceflight
 List of Progress missions
 List of uncrewed spaceflights to Salyut space stations

References

Progress (spacecraft) missions
1983 in the Soviet Union
Spacecraft launched in 1983
Spacecraft which reentered in 1983
Spacecraft launched by Soyuz-U rockets